Towner is a census-designated place (CDP) in and governed by Kiowa County, Colorado, United States. The population of the Towner CDP was 22 at the United States Census 2010. The Sheridan Lake post office (Zip Code 81071) serves Towner postal addresses.

History
Towner was originally known as "Memphis". It was a frequent attraction for Kansans when their state was "dry".

The town currently supports two grain elevators. Its population swells during harvest due to the influx of agricultural crews who often camp in the town. Towner students attend Plainview School, close to Sheridan Lake. It is responsible for the education of students in grades prekindergarten through grade 12.

Hunting opportunities are abundant in the area, with deer, antelope, and pheasant commonplace, as well as an occasional elk sighting.

In 1931, five students and their bus driver died in the Pleasant Hill bus tragedy near Towner.

Geography 
Towner is located in eastern Kiowa County. Colorado State Highway 96 passes through the community.

Demographics

See also

 List of census-designated places in Colorado

References

External links

 Towner @ Colorado.com
 Kiowa County website

Census-designated places in Kiowa County, Colorado
Census-designated places in Colorado